The 1999 Toronto Blue Jays season was the franchise's 23rd season of Major League Baseball. It resulted in the Blue Jays finishing third in the American League East with a record of 84 wins and 78 losses. The team set a franchise record for most runs scored in a season (883) and hits in a season (1,580). The previous Blue Jays records for most runs scored and most hits in a season were set in 1993 when the Jays scored 847 runs and collected 1,556 hits. Conversely, the Blue Jays pitching staff gave up the most runs of any Blue Jays team since 1979. It was the team's final season with original mascot BJ Birdy.

Offseason
October 27, 1998: Craig Grebeck was signed as a free agent with the Toronto Blue Jays.
 December 23, 1998: Rob Butler signed as a free agent with the Toronto Blue Jays.
 February 18, 1999: Roger Clemens was traded to the New York Yankees in exchange for former Blue Jay David Wells and second baseman Homer Bush.
March 14, 1999: Norberto Martin was signed as a free agent with the Toronto Blue Jays.
 March 17, 1999: Felipe Crespo was released by the Toronto Blue Jays.

Regular season

Season standings

Record vs. opponents

Notable transactions
April 1, 1999: Doug Bochtler was signed as a free agent with the Toronto Blue Jays.
May 5, 1999: Paul Spoljaric was traded by the Philadelphia Phillies to the Toronto Blue Jays for Robert Person.
May 7, 1999: Jacob Brumfield was selected off waivers by the Toronto Blue Jays from the Los Angeles Dodgers.
May 19, 1999: Doug Bochtler was purchased by the Los Angeles Dodgers from the Toronto Blue Jays.
 June 2, 1999: Brandon Lyon was drafted by the Toronto Blue Jays in the 14th round of the 1999 amateur draft. Player signed May 31, 2000.
 June 12, 1999: Dan Plesac was traded by the Toronto Blue Jays to the Arizona Diamondbacks for Tony Batista and John Frascatore.
 August 9, 1999: Brian McRae was traded by the Colorado Rockies to the Toronto Blue Jays for a player to be named later. The Toronto Blue Jays sent Pat Lynch (minors) (August 23, 1999) to the Colorado Rockies to complete the trade.

Roster

Game log

|- align="center" bgcolor="ffbbbb"
| 1 || April 6 || @ Twins || 6 – 1 || Radke (1-0) || Hentgen (0-1) || || 45,601 || 0-1
|- align="center" bgcolor="bbffbb"
| 2 || April 7 || @ Twins || 9 – 3 || Wells (1-0) || Lincoln (0-1) || Halladay (1) || 9,220 || 1-1
|- align="center" bgcolor="ffbbbb"
| 3 || April 8 || @ Twins || 11 – 9 || Trombley (1-0) || Hamilton (0-1) || Aguilera (1) || 9,431 || 1-2
|- align="center" bgcolor="bbffbb"
| 4 || April 9 || @ Orioles || 7 – 4 || Escobar (1-0) || Ponson (0-1) || || 36,430 || 2-2
|- align="center" bgcolor="ffbbbb"
| 5 || April 10 || @ Orioles || 1 – 0 || Mussina (2-0) || Carpenter (0-1) || Timlin (2) || 43,700 || 2-3
|- align="center" bgcolor="bbffbb"
| 6 || April 11 || @ Orioles || 9 – 5 || Halladay (1-0) || Orosco (0-1) || || 40,273 || 3-3
|- align="center" bgcolor="bbffbb"
| 7 || April 12 || Devil Rays || 7 – 1 || Wells (2-0) || Saunders (1-1) || || 37,160 || 4-3
|- align="center" bgcolor="ffbbbb"
| 8 || April 13 || Devil Rays || 8 – 5 || White (1-0) || Hamilton (0-2) || Hernández (3) || 23,710 || 4-4
|- align="center" bgcolor="bbffbb"
| 9 || April 14 || Devil Rays || 7 – 6 (11) || Lloyd (1-0) || Lopez (0-1)  || || 23,847 || 5-4
|- align="center" bgcolor="bbffbb"
| 10 || April 15 || Devil Rays || 11 – 1 || Carpenter (1-1) || Santana (0-2) || || 23,765 || 6-4
|- align="center" bgcolor="bbffbb"
| 11 || April 16 || Orioles || 7 – 6 || Lloyd (2-0) || Bones (0-1) || Person (1) || 25,281 || 7-4
|- align="center" bgcolor="bbffbb"
| 12 || April 17 || Orioles || 7 – 4 || Wells (3-0) || Linton (0-1) || Lloyd (1) || 30,739 || 8-4
|- align="center" bgcolor="bbffbb"
| 13 || April 18 || Orioles || 6 – 0 || Halladay (2-0) || Guzmán (0-2) || || 27,126 || 9-4
|- align="center" bgcolor="bbffbb"
| 14 || April 20 || Angels || 5 – 1 || Escobar (2-0) || Finley (1-2) || || 23,775 || 10-4
|- align="center" bgcolor="bbffbb"
| 15 || April 21 || Angels || 3 – 2 || Carpenter (2-1) || Olivares (2-1) || Person (2) || 23,749 || 11-4
|- align="center" bgcolor="bbffbb"
| 16 || April 22 || Angels || 8 – 7 || Davey (1-0) || Petkovsek (0-1) || Lloyd (2) || 28,212 || 12-4
|- align="center" bgcolor="ffbbbb"
| 17 || April 23 || @ Yankees || 6 – 4 || Hernández (3-1) || Wells (3-1) || Rivera (3) || 36,529 || 12-5
|- align="center" bgcolor="ffbbbb"
| 18 || April 24 || @ Yankees || 7 – 4 || Mendoza (2-1) || Plesac (0-1) || Rivera (4) || 46,924 || 12-6
|- align="center" bgcolor="ffbbbb"
| 19 || April 25 || @ Yankees || 4 – 3 (11) || Grimsley (1-0) || Person (0-1) || || 51,903 || 12-7
|- align="center" bgcolor="ffbbbb"
| 20 || April 26 || @ Angels || 4 – 3 (11) || Percival (1-1) || Rodríguez (0-1) || || 17,324 || 12-8
|- align="center" bgcolor="bbffbb"
| 21 || April 27 || @ Angels || 10 – 1 || Hentgen (1-1) || Olivares (2-2) || || 17,899 || 13-8
|- align="center" bgcolor="ffbbbb"
| 22 || April 28 || @ Angels || 12 – 10 || Petkovsek (1-1) || Lloyd (2-1) || Percival (3) || 18,304 || 13-9
|- align="center" bgcolor="ffbbbb"
| 23 || April 29 || @ Angels || 17 – 1 || Hill (1-1) || Halladay (2-1) || || 18,346 || 13-10
|- align="center" bgcolor="ffbbbb"
| 24 || April 30 || @ Mariners || 11 – 9 || Halama (1-2) || Person (0-2) || Mesa (6) || 29,353 || 13-11
|-

|- align="center" bgcolor="bbffbb"
| 25 || May 1 || @ Mariners || 9 – 3 || Carpenter (3-1) || Moyer (1-4) || Davey (1) || 35,628 || 14-11
|- align="center" bgcolor="ffbbbb"
| 26 || May 2 || @ Mariners || 3 – 2 || Cloude (3-1) || Plesac (0-2) || || 31,355 || 14-12
|- align="center" bgcolor="bbffbb"
| 27 || May 3 || @ Mariners || 16 – 10 || Wells (4-1) || García (3-1) || || 22,304 || 15-12
|- align="center" bgcolor="ffbbbb"
| 28 || May 4 || Athletics || 13 – 4 || Oquist (3-2) || Halladay (2-2) || Jones (1) || 20,258 || 15-13
|- align="center" bgcolor="ffbbbb"
| 29 || May 5 || Athletics || 8 – 2 || Rogers (1-2) || Escobar (2-1) || || 20,314 || 15-14
|- align="center" bgcolor="ffbbbb"
| 30 || May 6 || Athletics || 3 – 2 || Heredia (2-2) || Carpenter (3-2) || Taylor (7) || 20,310 || 15-15
|- align="center" bgcolor="bbffbb"
| 31 || May 7 || Rangers || 9 – 6 || Hentgen (2-1) || Clark (2-3) || Koch (1) || 22,110 || 16-15
|- align="center" bgcolor="ffbbbb"
| 32 || May 8 || Rangers || 4 – 3 || Morgan (5-2) || Wells (4-2) || Wetteland (10) || 24,642 || 16-16
|- align="center" bgcolor="ffbbbb"
| 33 || May 9 || Rangers || 11 – 6 || Patterson (1-0) || Munro (0-1) || || 20,374 || 16-17
|- align="center" bgcolor="bbffbb"
| 34 || May 11 || @ Royals || 8 – 2 || Escobar (3-1) || Pittsley (1-2) || || 12,141 || 17-17
|- align="center" bgcolor="ffbbbb"
| 35 || May 12 || @ Royals || 7 – 1 || Appier (4-2) || Carpenter (3-3) || || 13,073 || 17-18
|- align="center" bgcolor="bbffbb"
| 36 || May 13 || @ Royals || 8 – 2 || Hentgen (3-1) || Rosado (2-2) || || 19,573 || 18-18
|- align="center" bgcolor="ffbbbb"
| 37 || May 14 || Red Sox || 5 – 0 || Peña (2-0) || Wells (4-3) || || 22,186 || 18-19
|- align="center" bgcolor="ffbbbb"
| 38 || May 15 || Red Sox || 6 – 5 || Wasdin (2-0) || Plesac (0-3) || Gordon (4) || 24,579 || 18-20
|- align="center" bgcolor="bbffbb"
| 39 || May 16 || Red Sox || 9 – 6 || Lloyd (3-1) || Gross (0-2) || || 21,094 || 19-20
|- align="center" bgcolor="ffbbbb"
| 40 || May 17 || Red Sox || 8 – 7 || Wasdin (3-0) || Lloyd (3-2) || || 20,395 || 19-21
|- align="center" bgcolor="bbffbb"
| 41 || May 18 || Tigers || 7 – 5 || Hentgen (4-1) || Thompson (4-5) || Koch (2) || 20,310 || 20-21
|- align="center" bgcolor="ffbbbb"
| 42 || May 19 || Tigers || 7 – 3 || Moehler (4-3) || Wells (4-4) || || 20,384 || 20-22
|- align="center" bgcolor="bbffbb"
| 43 || May 20 || Tigers || 7 – 0 || Halladay (3-2) || Mlicki (1-4) || || 21,137 || 21-22
|- align="center" bgcolor="ffbbbb"
| 44 || May 21 || @ Red Sox || 5 – 2 || Rapp (2-2) || Escobar (3-2) || || 27,284 || 21-23
|- align="center" bgcolor="ffbbbb"
| 45 || May 22 || @ Red Sox || 6 – 4 || Wakefield (2-4) || Carpenter (3-4) || Gordon (6) || 32,038 || 21-24
|- align="center" bgcolor="ffbbbb"
| 46 || May 23 || @ Red Sox || 10 – 8 || Martínez (9-1) || Hentgen (4-2) || Gordon (7) || 28,559 || 21-25
|- align="center" bgcolor="bbffbb"
| 47 || May 24 || @ Tigers || 12 – 6 || Wells (5-4) || Moehler (4-4) || || 13,038 || 22-25
|- align="center" bgcolor="bbffbb"
| 48 || May 25 || @ Tigers || 5 – 3 || Halladay (4-2) || Mlicki (1-5) || Koch (3) || 13,087 || 23-25
|- align="center" bgcolor="bbffbb"
| 49 || May 26 || @ Tigers || 9 – 5 || Escobar (4-2) || Blair (1-5) || Lloyd (3) || 14,177 || 24-25
|- align="center" bgcolor="ffbbbb"
| 50 || May 28 || Yankees || 10 – 6 || Pettitte (3-2) || Carpenter (3-5) || || 30,355 || 24-26
|- align="center" bgcolor="ffbbbb"
| 51 || May 29 || Yankees || 8 – 3 || Cone (5-2) || Hentgen (4-3) || || 40,175 || 24-27
|- align="center" bgcolor="ffbbbb"
| 52 || May 30 || Yankees || 8 – 3 || Irabu (2-3) || Wells (5-5) || || 39,111 || 24-28
|-

|- align="center" bgcolor="ffbbbb"
| 53 || June 1 || White Sox || 6 – 2 || Sirotka (3-6) || Escobar (4-3) || || 20,399 || 24-29
|- align="center" bgcolor="bbffbb"
| 54 || June 2 || White Sox || 9 – 7 || Carpenter (4-5) || Snyder (6-4) || Koch (4) || 22,197 || 25-29
|- align="center" bgcolor="ffbbbb"
| 55 || June 3 || White Sox || 10 – 3 || Navarro (4-4) || Hentgen (4-4) || || 33,673 || 25-30
|- align="center" bgcolor="bbffbb"
| 56 || June 4 || Expos || 6 – 2 || Wells (6-5) || Ayala (0-5) || || 24,147 || 26-30
|- align="center" bgcolor="ffbbbb"
| 57 || June 5 || Expos || 5 – 0 || Batista (5-2) || Hamilton (0-3) || || 28,112 || 26-31
|- align="center" bgcolor="bbffbb"
| 58 || June 6 || Expos || 9 – 2 || Escobar (5-3) || Hermanson (3-5) || || 24,392 || 27-31
|- align="center" bgcolor="ffbbbb"
| 59 || June 7 || @ Mets || 8 – 2 || Hershiser (5-5) || Halladay (4-3) || || 21,457 || 27-32
|- align="center" bgcolor="ffbbbb"
| 60 || June 8 || @ Mets || 11 – 3 || Isringhausen (1-1) || Hentgen (4-5) || || 18,984 || 27-33
|- align="center" bgcolor="ffbbbb"
| 61 || June 9 || @ Mets || 4 – 3 (14)|| Mahomes (2-0) || Davey (1-1) || || 18,254 || 27-34
|- align="center" bgcolor="ffbbbb"
| 62 || June 11 || @ Phillies || 8 – 4 || Wolf (1-0) || Hamilton (0-4) || || 26,541 || 27-35
|- align="center" bgcolor="ffbbbb"
| 63 || June 12 || @ Phillies || 7 – 2 || Byrd (9-3) || Escobar (5-4) || || 20,449 || 27-36
|- align="center" bgcolor="bbffbb"
| 64 || June 13 || @ Phillies || 7 – 2 || Hentgen (5-5) || Schilling (8-4) || || 28,459 || 28-36
|- align="center" bgcolor="bbffbb"
| 65 || June 15 || Angels || 13 – 2 || Wells (7-5) || Belcher (4-6) || || 21,165 || 29-36
|- align="center" bgcolor="bbffbb"
| 66 || June 16 || Angels || 3 – 2 || Lloyd (4-2) || Schoeneweis (0-1) || Koch (5) || 22,184 || 30-36
|- align="center" bgcolor="bbffbb"
| 67 || June 17 || Angels || 3 – 0 || Escobar (6-4) || Hill (3-6) || Koch (6) || 20,465 || 31-36
|- align="center" bgcolor="ffbbbb"
| 68 || June 18 || Royals || 6 – 5 || Witasick (2-5) || Hentgen (5-6) || Whisenant (1) || 24,245 || 31-37
|- align="center" bgcolor="bbffbb"
| 69 || June 19 || Royals || 7 – 0 || Halladay (5-3) || Appier (6-6) || || 23,369 || 32-37
|- align="center" bgcolor="bbffbb"
| 70 || June 20 || Royals || 2 – 1 || Wells (8-5) || Service (3-2) || || 24,211 || 33-37
|- align="center" bgcolor="bbffbb"
| 71 || June 21 || Royals || 11 – 4 || Hamilton (1-4) || Fussell (0-4) || || 20,394 || 34-37
|- align="center" bgcolor="bbffbb"
| 72 || June 22 || Indians || 4 – 3 || Escobar (7-4) || Gooden (2-3) || Koch (7) || 22,197 || 35-37
|- align="center" bgcolor="ffbbbb"
| 73 || June 23 || Indians || 9 – 6 || Nagy (9-4) || Quantrill (0-1) || || 23,271 || 35-38
|- align="center" bgcolor="bbffbb"
| 74 || June 24 || Indians || 3 – 0 || Halladay (6-3) || Burba (7-3) || Koch (8) || 26,117 || 36-38
|- align="center" bgcolor="ffbbbb"
| 75 || June 25 || @ Devil Rays || 11 – 4 || Álvarez (3-5) || Wells (8-6) || || 18,633 || 36-39
|- align="center" bgcolor="ffbbbb"
| 76 || June 26 || @ Devil Rays || 5 – 2 || Rupe (4-3) || Hamilton (1-5) || Hernández (21) || 22,062 || 36-40
|- align="center" bgcolor="ffbbbb"
| 77 || June 27 || @ Devil Rays || 8 – 0 || Witt (4-4) || Escobar (7-5) || || 20,556 || 36-41
|- align="center" bgcolor="bbffbb"
| 78 || June 28 || @ Devil Rays || 3 – 2 || Carpenter (5-5) || Eiland (0-4) || Koch (9) || 17,727 || 37-41
|- align="center" bgcolor="bbffbb"
| 79 || June 29 || Orioles || 6 – 5 (10)|| Frascatore (1-0) || Rhodes (3-3) || || 21,421 || 38-41
|- align="center" bgcolor="bbffbb"
| 80 || June 30 || Orioles || 10 – 9 (10)|| Frascatore (2-0) || Orosco (0-2) || || 21,137 || 39-41
|-

|- align="center" bgcolor="bbffbb"
| 81 || July 1 || Orioles || 8 – 6 || Frascatore (3-0) || Timlin (3-7) || Koch (10) || 30,263 || 40-41
|- align="center" bgcolor="ffbbbb"
| 82 || July 2 || Devil Rays || 8 – 7 || Aldred (3-2) || Escobar (7-6) || Hernández (22) || 23,109 || 40-42
|- align="center" bgcolor="bbffbb"
| 83 || July 3 || Devil Rays || 5 – 0 || Carpenter (6-5) || Witt (4-5) || || 25,344 || 41-42
|- align="center" bgcolor="bbffbb"
| 84 || July 4 || Devil Rays || 6 – 3 || Hentgen (6-6) || White (4-2) || Koch (11) || 24,639 || 42-42
|- align="center" bgcolor="bbffbb"
| 85 || July 6 || @ Orioles || 4 – 3 (10)|| Lloyd (5-2) || Timlin (3-8) || Koch (12) || 37,939 || 43-42
|- align="center" bgcolor="bbffbb"
| 86 || July 7 || @ Orioles || 7 – 6 || Spoljaric (1-0) || Molina (0-1) || Koch (13) || 42,275 || 44-42
|- align="center" bgcolor="bbffbb"
| 87 || July 8 || @ Orioles || 11 – 6 || Escobar (8-6) || Ponson (7-6) || || 41,738 || 45-42
|- align="center" bgcolor="ffbbbb"
| 88 || July 9 || @ Expos || 4 – 3 || Urbina (5-4) || Lloyd (5-3) || || 10,091 || 45-43
|- align="center" bgcolor="bbffbb"
| 89 || July 10 || @ Expos || 7 – 6 || Quantrill (1-1) || Telford (2-2) || Koch (14) || 15,005 || 46-43
|- align="center" bgcolor="bbffbb"
| 90 || July 11 || @ Expos || 1 – 0 || Wells (9-6) || Pavano (6-8) || || 15,201 || 47-43
|- align="center" bgcolor="ffbbbb"
| 91 || July 15 || Marlins || 8 – 6 || Looper (2-1) || Koch (0-1) || Alfonseca (2) || 25,072 || 47-44
|- align="center" bgcolor="ffbbbb"
| 92 || July 16 || Marlins || 4 – 2 || Springer (4-10) || Hentgen (6-7) || Alfonseca (3) || 22,449 || 47-45
|- align="center" bgcolor="bbffbb"
| 93 || July 17 || Marlins || 6 – 1 || Wells (10-6) || Edmondson (3-4) || || 27,159 || 48-45
|- align="center" bgcolor="bbffbb"
| 94 || July 18 || Braves || 3 – 2 || Hamilton (2-5) || Millwood (11-5) || Koch (15) || 31,137 || 49-45
|- align="center" bgcolor="bbffbb"
| 95 || July 19 || Braves || 8 – 7 (10)|| Frascatore (4-0) || Hudek (0-2) || || 31,064 || 50-45
|- align="center" bgcolor="bbffbb"
| 96 || July 20 || Braves || 11 – 6 || Halladay (7-3) || Glavine (8-9) || || 28,366 || 51-45
|- align="center" bgcolor="bbffbb"
| 97 || July 21 || @ Indians || 4 – 3 || Frascatore (5-0) || Jackson (3-3) || Koch (16) || 43,218 || 52-45
|- align="center" bgcolor="bbffbb"
| 98 || July 22 || @ Indians || 4 – 3 || Wells (11-6) || Nagy (11-6) || Koch (17) || 43,138 || 53-45
|- align="center" bgcolor="bbffbb"
| 99 || July 23 || @ White Sox || 2 – 1 || Hamilton (3-5) || Parque (9-7) || Koch (18) || 14,166 || 54-45
|- align="center" bgcolor="ffbbbb"
| 100 || July 24 || @ White Sox || 6 – 5 || Eyre (1-0) || Escobar (8-7) || Howry (16) || 25,674 || 54-46
|- align="center" bgcolor="bbffbb"
| 101 || July 25 || @ White Sox || 11 – 3 || Carpenter (7-5) || Sirotka (7-9) || || 18,299 || 55-46
|- align="center" bgcolor="bbffbb"
| 102 || July 26 || @ White Sox || 4 – 3 (11)|| Frascatore (6-0) || Howry (2-2) || Koch (19) || 17,631 || 56-46
|- align="center" bgcolor="ffbbbb"
| 103 || July 27 || Red Sox || 11 – 9 || Guthrie (1-1) || Halladay (7-4) || Wakefield (13) || 38,631 || 56-47
|- align="center" bgcolor="ffbbbb"
| 104 || July 28 || Red Sox || 8 – 0 || Rapp (3-5) || Hamilton (3-6) || || 36,190 || 56-48
|- align="center" bgcolor="bbffbb"
| 105 || July 30 || Tigers || 8 – 2 || Escobar (9-7) || Weaver (6-7) || || 28,412 || 57-48
|- align="center" bgcolor="bbffbb"
| 106 || July 31 || Tigers || 7 – 6 || Halladay (8-4) || Mlicki (5-10) || Koch (20) || 29,527 || 58-48
|-

|- align="center" bgcolor="bbffbb"
| 107 || August 1 || Tigers || 8 – 5 || Hentgen (7-7) || Borkowski (0-2) || Koch (21) || 30,105 || 59-48
|- align="center" bgcolor="ffbbbb"
| 108 || August 2 || @ Yankees || 3 – 1 || Pettitte (8-8) || Wells (11-7) || Rivera (28) || 40,825 || 59-49
|- align="center" bgcolor="bbffbb"
| 109 || August 3 || @ Yankees || 3 – 1 || Hamilton (4-6) || Cone (10-6) || Koch (22) || 43,110 || 60-49
|- align="center" bgcolor="ffbbbb"
| 110 || August 4 || @ Yankees || 8 – 3 || Irabu (9-3) || Escobar (9-8) || || 52,833 || 60-50
|- align="center" bgcolor="bbffbb"
| 111 || August 6 || @ Rangers || 5 – 4 || Carpenter (8-5) || Zimmerman (9-1) || Koch (23) || 31,664 || 61-50
|- align="center" bgcolor="ffbbbb"
| 112 || August 7 || @ Rangers || 6 – 0 || Sele (12-6) || Hentgen (7-8) || || 40,329 || 61-51
|- align="center" bgcolor="bbffbb"
| 113 || August 8 || @ Rangers || 8 – 7 || Frascatore (7-0) || Venafro (3-2) || Koch (24) || 32,374 || 62-51
|- align="center" bgcolor="bbffbb"
| 114 || August 9 || @ Rangers || 19 – 4 || Hamilton (5-6) || Morgan (12-7) || || 23,235 || 63-51
|- align="center" bgcolor="bbffbb"
| 115 || August 10 || @ Twins || 10 – 6 || Escobar (10-8) || Radke (8-11) || || 15,842 || 64-51
|- align="center" bgcolor="bbffbb"
| 116 || August 11 || @ Twins || 6 – 3 || Carpenter (9-5) || Milton (4-9) || || 15,777 || 65-51
|- align="center" bgcolor="ffbbbb"
| 117 || August 12 || @ Twins || 3 – 0 || Mays (5-4) || Hentgen (7-9) || Trombley (19) || 21,206 || 65-52
|- align="center" bgcolor="ffbbbb"
| 118 || August 13 || Athletics || 9 – 8 || Appier (12-9) || Halladay (8-5) || Jones (7) || 34,150 || 65-53
|- align="center" bgcolor="ffbbbb"
| 119 || August 14 || Athletics || 13 – 5 || Hudson (7-1) || Hamilton (5-7) || || 37,113 || 65-54
|- align="center" bgcolor="ffbbbb"
| 120 || August 15 || Athletics || 9 – 5 || Oquist (9-7) || Escobar (10-9) || || 34,677 || 65-55
|- align="center" bgcolor="ffbbbb"
| 121 || August 16 || Mariners || 7 – 5 || Moyer (12-6) || Carpenter (9-6) || Mesa (26) || 29,308 || 65-56
|- align="center" bgcolor="ffbbbb"
| 122 || August 17 || Mariners || 8 – 5 || Abbott (4-0) || Hentgen (7-10) || Mesa (27) || 30,137 || 65-57
|- align="center" bgcolor="ffbbbb"
| 123 || August 18 || Mariners || 5 – 1 || García (12-7) || Wells (11-8) || Paniagua (3) || 38,224 || 65-58
|- align="center" bgcolor="bbffbb"
| 124 || August 20 || @ Athletics || 11 – 0 || Hamilton (6-7) || Oquist (9-8) || || 13,335 || 66-58
|- align="center" bgcolor="ffbbbb"
| 125 || August 21 || @ Athletics || 8 – 4 || Olivares (11-9) || Carpenter (9-7) || || 26,282 || 66-59
|- align="center" bgcolor="ffbbbb"
| 126 || August 22 || @ Athletics || 4 – 3 || Jones (4-5) || Koch (0-2) || || 23,907 || 66-60
|- align="center" bgcolor="bbffbb"
| 127 || August 23 || @ Athletics || 9 – 4 || Wells (12-8) || Appier (12-11) || || 10,047 || 67-60
|- align="center" bgcolor="bbffbb"
| 128 || August 24 || @ Angels || 5 – 1 || Hentgen (8-10) || Ortiz (1-1) || Koch (25) || 21,492 || 68-60
|- align="center" bgcolor="bbffbb"
| 129 || August 25 || @ Angels || 7 – 2 || Hamilton (7-7) || Finley (8-11) || || 21,592 || 69-60
|- align="center" bgcolor="ffbbbb"
| 130 || August 27 || Rangers || 8 – 2 || Helling (11-7) || Carpenter (9-8) || || 30,181 || 69-61
|- align="center" bgcolor="ffbbbb"
| 131 || August 28 || Rangers || 9 – 7 || Sele (15-7) || Wells (12-9) || Wetteland (35) || 31,117 || 69-62
|- align="center" bgcolor="ffbbbb"
| 132 || August 29 || Rangers || 4 – 2 || Burkett (5-7) || Halladay (8-6) || Wetteland (36) || 30,502 || 69-63
|- align="center" bgcolor="bbffbb"
| 133 || August 30 || Twins || 2 – 1 || Hentgen (9-10) || Ryan (0-2) || Koch (26) || 22,137 || 70-63
|- align="center" bgcolor="ffbbbb"
| 134 || August 31 || Twins || 14 – 3 || Radke (11-12) || Hamilton (7-8) || || 23,136 || 70-64
|-

|- align="center" bgcolor="bbffbb"
| 135 || September 1 || Twins || 4 – 0 || Escobar (11-9) || Milton (6-11) || || 23,145 || 71-64
|- align="center" bgcolor="bbffbb"
| 136 || September 2 || Twins || 6 – 1 || Wells (13-9) || Mays (5-7) || || 22,255 || 72-64
|- align="center" bgcolor="bbffbb"
| 137 || September 3 || @ Royals || 5 – 4 || Quantrill (2-1) || Morman (2-3) || Koch (27) || 13,857 || 73-64
|- align="center" bgcolor="bbffbb"
| 138 || September 4 || @ Royals || 6 – 3  (9) || Hentgen (10-10) || Suppan (8-9) || Frascatore (1) || 15,243 || 74-64
|- align="center" bgcolor="ffbbbb"
| 139 || September 5 || @ Royals || 6 – 3 || Witasick (6-11) || Escobar (11-10) || Fussell (2) || 15,315 || 74-65
|- align="center" bgcolor="ffbbbb"
| 140 || September 7 || @ Mariners || 7 – 4 || Meche (6-4) || Wells (13-10) || Mesa (32) || 39,709 || 74-66
|- align="center" bgcolor="ffbbbb"
| 141 || September 8 || @ Mariners || 4 – 3 || Mesa (2-5) || Koch (0-3) || || 36,971 || 74-67
|- align="center" bgcolor="ffbbbb"
| 142 || September 10 || @ Tigers || 7 – 6 || Jones (3-4) || Frascatore (7-1) || || 33,736 || 74-68
|- align="center" bgcolor="bbffbb"
| 143 || September 11 || @ Tigers || 9 – 5 || Spoljaric (2-0) || Cordero (1-2) || || 40,269 || 75-68
|- align="center" bgcolor="bbffbb"
| 144 || September 12 || @ Tigers || 5 – 3 || Escobar (12-10) || Weaver (8-11) || Koch (28) || 39,349 || 76-68
|- align="center" bgcolor="bbffbb"
| 145 || September 13 || Yankees || 2 – 1 || Wells (14-10) || Hernández (16-8) || || 30,118 || 77-68
|- align="center" bgcolor="ffbbbb"
| 146 || September 14 || Yankees || 10 – 6 || Mendoza (7-8) || Koch (0-4) || || 29,140 || 77-69
|- align="center" bgcolor="ffbbbb"
| 147 || September 15 || Yankees || 6 – 4 || Pettitte (13-11) || Hentgen (10-11) || Rivera (41) || 29,460 || 77-70
|- align="center" bgcolor="ffbbbb"
| 148 || September 17 || White Sox || 7 – 3 || Wells (3-1) || Escobar (12-11) || || 30,743 || 77-71
|- align="center" bgcolor="ffbbbb"
| 149 || September 18 || White Sox || 7 – 4 || Navarro (8-12) || Quantrill (2-2) || Howry (23) || 28,260 || 77-72
|- align="center" bgcolor="ffbbbb"
| 150 || September 19 || White Sox || 3 – 2 || Sirotka (10-13) || Halladay (8-7) || Howry (24) || 27,120 || 77-73
|- align="center" bgcolor="ffbbbb"
| 151 || September 21 || @ Red Sox || 3 – 0 || Martínez (22-4) || Hentgen (10-12) || || 27,799 || 77-74
|- align="center" bgcolor="bbffbb"
| 152 || September 22 || @ Red Sox || 14 – 9 || Escobar (13-11) || Rapp (6-7) || || 25,345 || 78-74
|- align="center" bgcolor="bbffbb"
| 153 || September 23 || @ Red Sox || 7 – 5 || Wells (15-10) || Beck (0-1) || Koch (29) || 30,780 || 79-74
|- align="center" bgcolor="ffbbbb"
| 154 || September 24 || Indians || 18 – 4 || Brower (2-1) || Munro (0-2) || || 26,620 || 79-75
|- align="center" bgcolor="ffbbbb"
| 155 || September 25 || Indians || 9 – 6 || Colón (17-5) || Spoljaric (2-1) || Jackson (38) || 32,029 || 79-76
|- align="center" bgcolor="ffbbbb"
| 156 || September 26 || Indians || 11 – 7 || Shuey (8-5) || Koch (0-5) || || 34,253 || 79-77
|- align="center" bgcolor="bbffbb"
| 157 || September 28 || @ Devil Rays || 8 – 2 || Wells (16-10) || Wheeler (0-4) || || 19,781 || 80-77
|- align="center" bgcolor="bbffbb"
| 158 || September 29 || @ Devil Rays || 6 – 2 || Escobar (14-11) || Witt (7-15) || || 22,180 || 81-77
|- align="center" bgcolor="ffbbbb"
| 159 || September 30 || @ Indians || 9 – 2 || Colón (18-5) || Spoljaric (2-2) || || 43,201 || 81-78
|-

|- align="center" bgcolor="bbffbb"
| 160 || October 1 || @ Indians || 8 – 6 || Quantrill (3-2) || Karsay (10-2) || Koch (30) || 43,040 || 82-78
|- align="center" bgcolor="bbffbb"
| 161 || October 2 || @ Indians || 7 – 3 || Hentgen (11-12) || Wright (8-10) || Koch (31) || 43,049 || 83-78
|- align="center" bgcolor="bbffbb"
| 162 || October 3 || @ Indians || 9 – 2 || Wells (17-10) || Burba (15-9) || || 43,012 || 84-78
|-

Player stats

Batting

Starters by position
Note: Pos = Position; G = Games played; AB = At bats; H = Hits; Avg. = Batting average; HR = Home runs; RBI = Runs batted in

Other batters
Note: G = Games played; AB = At bats; H = Hits; Avg. = Batting average; HR = Home runs; RBI = Runs batted in

Pitching

Starting pitchers
Note: G = Games pitched; IP = Innings pitched; W = Wins; L = Losses; ERA = Earned run average; SO = Strikeouts

Other pitchers
Note: G = Games pitched; IP = Innings pitched; W = Wins; L = Losses; ERA = Earned run average; SO = Strikeouts

Relief pitchers
Note: G = Games pitched; W = Wins; L = Losses; SV = Saves; ERA = Earned run average; SO = Strikeouts

Award winners
 Carlos Delgado, Silver Slugger Award
 Shawn Green, Gold Glove Award
 Shawn Green, Silver Slugger Award
All-Star Game
Tony Fernández, 3B
Shawn Green, OF

Farm system

References

External links
1999 Toronto Blue Jays at Baseball Reference
1999 Toronto Blue Jays at Baseball Almanac

Toronto Blue Jays seasons
1999 in Canadian sports
Toronto Blue Jays
1999 in Toronto